Mori is a surname and a given name.

Mori may also refer to:

: A Japanese word for "forest".
Mori (მორი): A Georgian word for "Log".
A Latin word for "death". In modern Italian, "mori" may also derive from Latin maurus that means "dark skinned".
Memento mori, artistic creations to remind people of their own mortality, Latin for "Remember to die".
Vincere aut mori, Wilhelm Sebastian von Belling's slogan, Latin for "Victory or death".
mori, is a horse in Mongolian, the last i vowel is not pronounced.

Groups
Mori (clan), a Rajput clan of India
MORI, a research organisation based in the United Kingdom
Mori clan (Genji), descendants of Genji in Japan
Mōri clan, a family of daimyō from Aki Province in Japan

Places
Mori, Andhra Pradesh, a village in East Godavari district, Andhra Pradesh, India
Mori, Uttar Pradesh, a village in Agra district, Uttar Pradesh, India
Mori, Uttarakhand, a village in Uttarkashi district, Uttarakhand, India
Mori, a town in Trentino, Italy
Mori, Shizuoka, a town in Shizuoka Prefecture, Japan
Mori, Hokkaidō, a town in Hokkaidō, Japan
Mori Kazakh Autonomous County, county in Xinjiang, China
Mori (restaurant), an historic New York City restaurant
Mori, Lake Titicaca a point on the shore, Peru

See also
Moori (disambiguation)
Mouri (disambiguation), another romanization of Mōri 
Māori, the indigenous people of New Zealand
Quattro Mori: Flag of Sardinia